Noonday Creek Structure Number 16 is a category 1 (high hazard) earthen dam on Noonday Creek regulated by the Georgia Safe Dams Program, located a few yards north of Big Shanty Road in Kennesaw, GA. Construction was completed in 1956.

Dimensions 

Notes 

Buildings and structures in Cobb County, Georgia
Dams in Georgia (U.S. state)